Excelsior is an unincorporated community in Upshur County, West Virginia, United States. It is located on County Route 151 along the Left Fork of Sand Run.

Unincorporated communities in Upshur County, West Virginia
Unincorporated communities in West Virginia